London Buses route 139 is a Transport for London contracted bus route in London, England. Running between Golders Green and Waterloo station, it is operated by Metroline.

Route 139 has a relatively long history at Metroline, however wasn't always based out of Cricklewood under their tenure. The route started operation in 1992 running out of a now closed garage in Chalk Farm, running between Trafalgar Square and West Hampstead, major change didn't come again until 2003 when the route was extended to Waterloo. The route was also moved into its long term home of Cricklewood (W) in 2002. 2017 was when the biggest change arguably happened to the route, with an extension to Golders Green, where route 139 currently orogins from to give the area a link south of Oxford Circus following the rerouting of route 13 to Victoria. At this time what ended up happening was as the 139 contract was due for renewal, the contract wasn't tendered and was just passed onto RATP to see out the remaining route 13 contract. This did place Metroline at a loss of two routes, but the 2020 tender saw the route returning to Metroline operation.

Soon after the tender was announced, it was made public that the buses to be used on the route would be the buses which were previously found on Potters Bar garage (PB)'s former route 34, as that route had been lost to Arriva in November 2019. This would also mark the introduction of non-New Routemaster Wrightbus vehicles to Cricklewood for the first time. The buses started arriving at Cricklewood prior to the national lockdown of March 2020 and managed to start spreading themselves over the garage's double decker routes, with them mostly being found on route 210.

Metroline took over operation of the route in the early hours of 29 August 2020, with VWH2023 being the first bus to welcome route 139 back to Metroline operation.

References 

Bus routes in London
Transport in the City of Westminster